National Tertiary Route 313, or just Route 313 (or ) is a National Road Route of Costa Rica, located in the San José province.

Description
In San José province the route covers Aserrí canton (San Gabriel, Legua, Monterrey districts), León Cortés Castro canton (San Pablo, Llano Bonito, San Isidro districts).

References

Highways in Costa Rica